Anastasia is a 1956 American period drama film directed by Anatole Litvak and written by Arthur Laurents. Set in interwar France, the film follows a plot related to rumors that the Grand Duchess Anastasia Nikolaevna of Russia, the youngest daughter of the late Tsar Nicholas II and Empress Alexandra Feodorovna, survived the execution of her family in 1918. Russian General Bounine (Yul Brynner), former leader of the White Army during the Russian Revolution, along with his associates plot to swindle an inheritance of £10 million from the Grand Duchess using an amnesiac (Ingrid Bergman) who looks remarkably like the missing Anastasia. The exiled émigrés of the Russian aristocracy, in particular the Dowager Empress Marie Feodorovna (Helen Hayes) of Denmark, must be convinced that their handpicked claimant is legitimate if the plotters are to get her money.

Anastasia was adapted from a 1952 play written by Guy Bolton and Marcelle Maurette. He was inspired by the story of Anna Anderson, the best known of the many Anastasia impostors who emerged after the Imperial family were killed in July 1918.

Plot
Though the last Russian Tsar and his family were executed in 1918, rumors persisted that his youngest daughter, the Grand Duchess Anastasia, somehow survived. In 1928 Paris, Anna, an ailing woman resembling Anastasia, is brought to the attention of former White Russian General Bounine, now the proprietor of a successful Russian-themed nightclub. Bounine knows that while Anna was in a mental asylum being treated for amnesia, she told a nun that she was Anastasia. When approached by Bounine and addressed as the grand duchess, she refuses to have anything to do with him. She flees and tries to throw herself into the River Seine, but is stopped.

Bounine meets with his associates Chernov and Petrovin. Bounine has already repeatedly raised funds from stockholders (eager to gain a share of £10 million belonging to Anastasia held by an English bank) based on his claim that he had found Anastasia. Privately he admits it is a scam. But the stockholders have lost their patience and given him eight days to produce her.

Bounine arranges for Anna to be intensively trained to pass as Anastasia. During this time, she and Bounine begin to develop feelings for one another. Later, in a series of carefully arranged encounters with former familiars and members of the imperial court, Anna begins to display a confidence and style that astonish her skeptical interlocutors.

Anna has to go to Copenhagen, where she has to convince the highly skeptical dowager empress, Anastasia's grandmother, that she is Anastasia Romanov. Meanwhile, Bounine becomes increasingly jealous of the attentions that Prince Paul, another fortune hunter, pays to Anna. At a grand ball in Copenhagen at which Anna/Anastasia's engagement to Paul is to be announced, the dowager empress has a final private conversation with her. Although aware of Bounine's machinations, Empress Marie Feodorovna believes that Anna is truly her granddaughter. Realizing that Anna has fallen in love with Bounine, she helps her run away with him. The empress then makes it known to those around her that Anna is not Anastasia, although it is left ambiguous if she accepts that notion.

Cast

 Ingrid Bergman as Anna Koreff / Anastasia
 Yul Brynner as General Bounine
 Helen Hayes as the Dowager Empress Marie Feodorovna
 Akim Tamiroff as Boris Andreevich Chernov
 Martita Hunt as Baroness Elena von Livenbaum
 Felix Aylmer as Chamberlain
 Sacha Pitoëff as Piotr Ivanovich Petrovin
 Ivan Desny as Prince Paul von Haraldberg (an invented character)
 Natalie Schafer as Irina Lissemskaia
 Grégoire Gromoff as Stepan
 Karel Štěpánek as Mikhail Vlados
 Ina De La Haye as Marusia
 Katherine Kath as Maxime

Production notes
The film was adapted by Guy Bolton and Arthur Laurents from the play by Bolton and Marcelle Maurette. Some critics believed the film was bound too much to the static settings and theatrical "scenes" of the play, but  additional, essentially decorative, ball scenes were added to open up the action.

The film does not reveal whether Anna is the Romanov princess, but suggests through subtle hints that she is. The gradual realisation of her true identity is juxtaposed against Bounine's growing romantic interest in Anna. In one speech, he says to Anna/Anastasia that he cares for who she is and not what her name is.

Hayes draws from her stage experience to deliver the film's last line, summing up the motion picture's exploration of identity and role-playing. Asked how she will explain the vanishing of her supposed granddaughter to a ballroom full of expectant guests, she declares, "I will tell them that the play is over, go home!" The film closes with the regal figure of the Dowager Empress on the arm of Prince Paul, descending the grand staircase.

The film marked Bergman's return to working for a Hollywood studio after several years of working in Italy with her husband, Roberto Rossellini. (Their marriage had caused a scandal, as he divorced his then current wife, Marcella DeMarchis to be with her.)

The film was also a comeback for Helen Hayes. She had suspended her career for several years due to the death of her daughter Mary, and her husband's failing health.

Locations
The film was shot on location in Copenhagen, London and Paris. Studio interiors were shot at MGM-British Studios at Borehamwood, England.

The Alexander Nevsky Russian Orthodox Cathedral in Paris, which was a center of worship for Russian aristocrats and other émigrés from St. Petersburg in the city, is featured in one of the early scenes.

Music
The theme song of the film, also titled "Anastasia", has been recorded by a number of artists. The most popular version was by Pat Boone, reaching number 3 (as a double-A-side with "Don't Forbid Me") on the Billboard Best Sellers in Stores chart for several weeks in early 1957.

Awards and nominations

See also
 List of American films of 1956
 Anastasia: The Mystery of Anna
 Anastasia (1997 film)
 Romanov impostors

References

External links

 
 
 
 
 

1956 films
1956 drama films
20th Century Fox films
American drama films
1950s English-language films
American films based on plays
Cultural depictions of Grand Duchess Anastasia Nikolaevna of Russia
Films about amnesia
Films directed by Anatole Litvak
Films featuring a Best Actress Academy Award-winning performance
Films featuring a Best Drama Actress Golden Globe-winning performance
Films scored by Alfred Newman
Films set in Copenhagen
Films set in France
Films set in 1928
CinemaScope films
Films shot at MGM-British Studios
Films with screenplays by Arthur Laurents
1950s American films